Tim Kay Petersen (born 3 March 1986) is a German former professional footballer who played as a defender.

Career 
Born in Hamburg, Petersen began his career at SV Lurup and Niendorfer TSV. In 2002, he played for the youth team of FC St. Pauli, joining in summer 2002 Hamburger SV until summer 2006. In the 2006–07 season, Petersen played for Altonaer FC von 1893 before he returned to FC St. Pauli. He was a member of the reserve team, playing in 27 matches. He made his debut in the 2. Bundesliga on 1 February 2008. On 15 May 2005, he was transferred to Thuringia club FC Carl Zeiss Jena, here signed a two-year contract. He joined VfB Oldenburg in June 2010.

References

1986 births
Living people
German footballers
Footballers from Hamburg
Association football defenders
2. Bundesliga players
3. Liga players
Hamburger SV II players
Altonaer FC von 1893 players
FC St. Pauli players
FC Carl Zeiss Jena players
VfB Oldenburg players
FC Eintracht Norderstedt 03 players